Calgary Wildfire were a W-League club based in Calgary, Alberta, Canada.

Year-by-year

Women's soccer clubs in Canada
W
United Soccer League teams based in Canada
Defunct USL W-League (1995–2015) teams